Stephen Flaherty (born September 18, 1960) is an American composer of musical theatre and film. He works most often in collaboration with the lyricist/book writer Lynn Ahrens. They are best known for writing the Broadway musicals Ragtime, which was nominated for thirteen Tony Awards, two Grammy Awards, and won the Tony for Best Original Score; Once on This Island, which won the Tony Award for Best Revival of a Musical, the Olivier Award for London's Best Musical, and was nominated for a Grammy Award and eight Tony Awards; and Seussical, which was nominated for a Grammy and is now one of the most performed shows in America. Flaherty was also nominated for two Academy Awards and two Golden Globe Awards (with Lynn Ahrens) for his songs and song score for the animated film musical Anastasia.

Biography
Flaherty was born in Pittsburgh, Pennsylvania. He began studying piano at the age of seven. When he was twelve, he knew he wanted to write musicals and by age fourteen he had already composed his first musical score. He attended South Hills Catholic High School in Pittsburgh and later studied musical composition and piano at University of Cincinnati College-Conservatory of Music, graduating in 1982. with a B.M. in Musical Composition.  He did additional graduate studies in Musical Theater at New York University.

Career
As a college student, Flaherty played ragtime piano in a dance band.  This early job would serve Flaherty well later in life when he had the opportunity to compose the score for the Broadway musical Ragtime.

He moved to New York City in 1982 and joined the BMI Lehman Engel Musical Theater Workshop, founded by music director Lehman Engel, where he met Lynn Ahrens, who was to become his longtime collaborator.  He also studied Musical Theater in the graduate program at New York University during this time, where his teachers included Richard Maltby, Jr. and Arthur Laurents, among others. The first Ahrens and Flaherty collaboration that was produced was a one-act children's show, The Emperor's New Clothes, for TheatreWorks USA in 1985.  Their next produced musical was Lucky Stiff, produced Off-Broadway in 1988 at Playwrights Horizons.

Their first Broadway musical was Once on This Island,  in 1990, which transferred from Off-Broadway's Playwrights Horizons. The musical was nominated for 8 Tony Awards including Best Musical, Best Book and Best Score. The London production of the show won the Olivier Award (London's Tony) for Best Musical in 1995. The show was later revived on Broadway in an immersive production at Circle in the Square in December 2017, where it was again nominated for 8 Tony Awards, winning for Best Revival of a Musical. The cast recording of the revival was nominated for the Grammy in 2019. It was Flaherty's first Grammy nomination as a producer.

In 1992, Flaherty and Ahrens were signed by Disney to write the animated musical Song of the Sea, a coming of age story about a humpback whale. Though the film was never produced, several key development executives on the project would play a part in Flaherty and Ahrens' later film musical, Anastasia.

Also in 1992, Flaherty and Ahrens wrote the musical My Favorite Year, based on the film of the same title, with a book by Joseph Dougherty. It was notably the first original American musical to be produced by Lincoln Center Theatre. Flaherty would eventually go on to write three additional original musicals for Lincoln Center Theatre, all in collaboration with Ms. Ahrens: A Man of No Importance (2002, with a book by Terrence McNally), Dessa Rose (2005) and The Glorious Ones (2007). He was nominated for Outstanding Music by the Drama Desk Awards on all three of these shows.

The critically acclaimed Ragtime (also with a book by Terrence McNally) had its world premiere in Toronto in December 1996, its American premiere in Los Angeles in June 1997 and its Broadway premiere in January 1998, where it ran for two years. It won four Tony Awards, including Best Book and Best Score (for Flaherty and Ahrens), the Drama Desk Award for Best Musical and was also nominated for two Grammy Awards for its two cast recordings. Its London production (2003) was nominated for the Olivier Award for Best Musical. The show was revived on Broadway in November 2009, where it was again critically acclaimed and nominated for the Tony Award for Best Revival of a Musical.

Following the success of Ragtime, Flaherty and Ahrens returned to Broadway in 2000 with Seussical, based on the works of Dr. Seuss, and co-conceived with Eric Idle.

The original Broadway cast album was nominated for a Grammy, and Flaherty also received a Drama Desk nomination for Best Music.

When the stock and amateur rights to the show were released following the Broadway run and its subsequent national tour, Seussical immediately became the most performed show in America. In 2008, there was a critically acclaimed off-Broadway revival directed by Marcia Milgrom Dodge, who would also go on to direct the Tony-nominated revival of Ragtime the following year.

After writing three shows for Lincoln Center Theatre, Flaherty and Ahrens next returned to Broadway with the musical Rocky the Musical. The show premiered in Hamburg, Germany in October 2012. The musical has a book by Thomas Meehan and Sylvester Stallone, based on Stallone's original screenplay. Rocky premiered on Broadway at the Winter Garden Theatre, officially opening on March 13, 2014. The musical was directed by Alex Timbers, with choreography by Steven Hoggett and Kelly Devine. The show was nominated for 4 Tony Awards and 7 Drama Desk Awards including Outstanding Musical.

Flaherty and Ahrens’ next musical, Little Dancer, featured direction and choreography by Susan Stroman.  Inspired by the famous sculpture, Little Dancer, Aged 14 by Edgar Degas, the musical had a reading in 2010 at Lincoln Center Theater and a developmental lab production in June 2010. The show premiered at the Kennedy Center's Eisenhower Theater in October 2014. The cast included Rebecca Luker, Boyd Gaines and Tiler Peck. The musical is inspired by true events and focuses on the relationship between a young ballerina and 19th century French painter and sculptor Edgar Degas. Much of the action is set in the Paris Opera Ballet. A re-working of the show, now titled Marie, Dancing Still (after the name of the young ballerina), had its west coast premiere at Seattle's 5th Avenue Theatre in March 2019.

Flaherty's next Broadway musical was Anastasia, featuring lyrics by Ms. Ahrens, a book by Terrence McNally, and based on the 1956 and 1997 films. The show premiered on Broadway in April 2017 after premiering at Hartford Stage in Connecticut the previous year. The show was subsequently produced in Madrid, Stuttgart and on tour in the United States in 2018, with a production in The Hague to open in 2019. During the 2017—2018 Broadway season Flaherty and Ahrens had the rare honor of having two shows running on Broadway at the same time, Anastasia and the revival of Once on This Island.

For his work in film, Flaherty was nominated for two Academy Awards with lyricist Ahrens (for Best Song and Best Score, the latter shared with David Newman) and two Golden Globe Awards for his first film, Anastasia (1997). He also composed the film score and wrote the songs for its animated sequel, Bartok the Magnificent (1999).  He wrote the original film score for the documentary After the Storm (2009), which follows a group of teenagers as they perform Ahrens and Flaherty's Once On This Island in New Orleans post-Hurricane Katrina. He composed the song score and co-wrote the film score for Lucky Stiff (2014), which was based on his and Ms. Ahrens' stage musical of the same name.

Occasionally Mr. Flaherty writes with other collaborators.  His "chamber-scale musical," Loving Repeating: A Musical of Gertrude Stein, written with his Ragtime director, Frank Galati, premiered in Chicago in February 2006, in a co-production between the About Face Theatre and the Museum of Contemporary Art.[11]  The musical won Chicago's Joseph Jefferson Award as the “Best New Work” of the year.  An earlier version of the show was initially titled A Long Gay Book, and had its premiere at Northwestern University in May 2003.[12]

Flaherty collaborated with the director-choreographer Christopher Gattelli on a new "dance-theatre musical", In Your Arms, which premiered at the Old Globe Theatre, San Diego, California, September 24, 2015. The show consists of 10 vignettes on the topic of “romantic destiny”, which were written by Douglas Carter Beane, Nilo Cruz, Christopher Durang, Carrie Fisher, David Henry Hwang, Rajiv Joseph, Terrence McNally, Marsha Norman, Lynn Nottage and Alfred Uhry, all of which were set to music by Flaherty. All the vignettes are danced without words. Lynn Ahrens wrote the lyrics for the title song.  The show starred Donna McKechnie and George Chakiris and eighteen powerhouse dancers.  The musical had a staged workshop during the summer of 2014 at New York Stage and Film & Vassar's Powerhouse Theater at Vassar College..

For the concert hall, Flaherty wrote the music for "With Voices Raised" (text by Lynn Ahrens), which was commissioned by the Boston Pops Orchestra in 1999.  It had its world premiere in Boston on July 4, 1999,  which was nationally televised, featuring Senator Ted Kennedy as one of the speakers.  It was subsequently released on the Pops' recording "A Splash of Pops" on the RCA Victor Label, July 13, 1999. He also wrote the music for the "American River Suite", with lyrics by Bill Schermerhorn and commissioned by Macy's. The piece premiered in April 2009 at Carnegie Hall by the New York Pops  and sung by Idina Menzel, Anika Noni Rose, and the children's chorus from the Choir Academy of Harlem.  It was broadcast nationally on the Fourth of July of that same year.

He has received several commissions from Carnegie Hall, the Guggenheim Museum and the Boston Pops Orchestra, among others. His most recent concert commission was from the Boston Pops Orchestra for "A Soldier's Carol" (2014, text by Ms. Ahrens), which was his final collaboration with orchestrator William David Brohn, who won the Tony Award for his orchestrations to Ragtime.

With Lynn Ahrens, Flaherty received the Oscar Hammerstein Award for Lifetime Achievement in 2014, was inducted into the Theater Hall Of Fame in 2015 and was nominated to the Songwriters Hall of Fame in 2018.

Flaherty and Ahrens are currently working on a musical adaptation of James Agee's Pulitzer Prize-winning novel A Death in the Family and Pulitzer Prize-winning play All the Way Home by Tad Mosel with Ragtime director Frank Galati, who is adapting the text and directing. The new musical, titled Knoxville, will have its world premiere at the Asolo Repertory Theatre, which commissioned the piece, in April 2022. It will star Jason Danieley as Author.

Personal
Flaherty married Trevor Hardwick on October 26, 2016 in New York City.<ref>[https://www.nytimes.com/2016/10/30/fashion/weddings/trevor-hardwick-stephen-flaherty.html?rref=collection%2Fsectioncollection%2Ftheater Weddings. Trevor Hardwick, Stephen Flaherty"], The New York Times, October 30, 2016</ref>

Works
Sources:"Internet Broadway database listing, Stephen Flaherty" ibdb.com, accessed January 31, 2010"Flaherty listing, Off-Broadway" Lortel.org, accessed January 31, 2010
 
Musicals
 Lucky Stiff (1988)
 Once on This Island (1990; Broadway revival 2017)
 My Favorite Year (1993)
 Ragtime (1998; Broadway revival 2009)
 Seussical (2000; revival 2007)
 A Man of No Importance (2002)
 A Long Gay Book (2003), an early version of Loving RepeatingJones, Kenneth. "Together Again, Galati and Flaherty Conjure Gertrude Stein in New Musical, 'A Long Gay Book'" Playbill, April 16, 2003
 Dessa Rose (2005)
 Loving Repeating (2006)
 Chita Rivera: The Dancer's Life (2005), music also by others
 The Glorious Ones (2007)
 Rocky the Musical (2012)
 Little Dancer (2014)
 Anastasia (2016), stage version of film
 Knoxville (2020)

Incidental music
 Proposals (1997)

Contributions
 "I Eat", contribution to The Seven Deadly Sins: A Song Cycle for Audra McDonald, performed at Carnegie Hall's Zankel Hall on June 2, 2004

Film scores
 Anastasia (1997)
 Buster & Chauncey's Silent Night (1998)
 Bartok the Magnificent (1999)
 After the Storm (2009)Catsoulis, Jeannette. "Movie review. 'After the Storm'" The new York Times, October 4, 2009Lucky Stiff (2014)''

Awards and nominations
Sources:

References

External links
Lynn Ahrens & Stephen Flaherty official website

Stephen Flaherty at the Internet Off Broadway Database

Interview, 2009, Time Out New York

1960 births
American film score composers
American male film score composers
American musical theatre composers
Animation composers
Broadway composers and lyricists
Drama Desk Award winners
Laurence Olivier Award winners
Living people
Male musical theatre composers
Musicians from Pittsburgh
Songwriters from Pennsylvania
Tony Award winners
University of Cincinnati – College-Conservatory of Music alumni